This is a list of islands of Romania.

Balta Ialomiței
Insula Ada Kaleh
Insula Ceaplace
Insula Golu
Insula Mare a Brăilei
Insula Mică a Brăilei
Insula Moldova Veche
Insula Popina
Insula Sacalinu Mic
Insula Sacalinu Mare
Insula Şimian
Insula Belina
Insula Cighineaua
Insula Ciobanu
Insula K
Ostrovul Calinovăţ
Ostrovul Moldova Veche
Ostrovul Braniştei
Ostrovul Gârla Mare
Ostrovul Chichinete
Ostrovu Mare
Ostrovu Acalia
Ostrovu Pietriş
Ostrovu Vană
Ostrovu Gâtanului
Ostrovu Copaniţa
Ostrovu Păpădiei
Ostrovu Băloiu
Ostrovul Calnovăţ with Ostrovul Mare, Islaz
Ostrovu Mic
Ostrovu Dinu
Ostrovu Urucu
Ostrovu Cioroiu
Ostrovu Mocanului
Ostrovu Elena
Ostrovul Ciocăneşti
Ostrovu Fermecat
Ostrovu Lung
Ostrovu Găzarului
Ostrovu Nou
Ostrovu Alionte
Ostrovu Balaban
Ostrovu Ruptura
Ostrovu Gâştei
Insula Vărsăturii
Ostrovul Crăcănel
Ostrovu Orbului
Iezeru Popii
Insula Calia
Insula Fundul Mare
Insula Arapului
Ostrovu Tătaru
Ostrovul Cernovca
Ostrovu Babina

Former islands
Ada Kaleh
Haţeg Island
Sacalinu Mic Island
Sacalinu Mare Island

See also 

 List of islands

Romania, List of islands of

Islands